Parliamentary elections were held in Slovakia on 8 and 9 June 1990 alongside federal elections. They were the first elections after the Velvet Revolution, and the first free elections since 1946. The Public Against Violence (VPN) party emerged as the largest in the Slovak National Council, winning 48 of the 150 seats. In the aftermath of the election, Vladimír Mečiar of the VPN formed a grand coalition with the Christian Democratic Movement (KDH). After a conflict leading to the dissolution of the VPN, the first Mečiar cabinet was brought down by a vote of non-confidence in the parliament. Ján Čarnogurský of the KDH became the new Prime Minister in April 1991.

Electoral system
These were the only elections with a 3% electoral threshold; it was raised to 5% for the 1992 elections.

Participating parties

Results

References

Parliamentary elections in Slovakia
Legislative elections in Czechoslovakia
Slovakia
1990 in Slovakia
June 1990 events in Europe